The Central District of Bajestan County is a district (bakhsh) in Bajestan County, Razavi Khorasan Province, Iran. At the 2006 census, its population was 14,518, in 4,033 families.  The district has one city: Bajestan.  The district has two rural districts (dehestan): Bajestan Rural District and Jazin Rural District.

References 

Districts of Razavi Khorasan Province
Bajestan County